Sabalia is a genus of moths in the family Brahmaeidae (older classifications placed it in Lemoniidae).

Selected species
Sabalia barnsi Prout, 1918
Sabalia fulleborni Karsch, 1900
Sabalia fulvicincta Hampson, 1901
Sabalia jacksoni (Sharpe, 1890)
Sabalia picarina Walker, 1865 (=Sabalia euterpe Fawcett, 1915)
Sabalia sericaria (Weymer, 1896)
Sabalia thalia Fawcett, 1915
Sabalia tippelskirchi Karsch, 1898 (=Sabalia tippelscirchi)

References

External links

Brahmaeidae
Moth genera